Chionanthus callophylloides grows as a tree up to  tall, with a trunk diameter of up to . The bark is brown. Its habitat is lowland mixed dipterocarp forest, sometimes in swamps. C. callophylloides is endemic to Malaysian Borneo (Sabah and Sarawak).

References

callophylloides
Endemic flora of Borneo
Trees of Borneo
Plants described in 2002